Neoscaptia angustifasciata is a moth of the family Erebidae. It was described by Max Gaede in 1926. It is found in New Guinea.

References

 

Moths described in 1926
Lithosiini